Julijana Matanović (born 6 April 1959) is a Bosnian Croat short story writer and novelist. She is also a professor at the University of Zagreb, Faculty of Humanities and Social Sciences, where she teaches contemporary Croatian literature.

Life 
She was born in Gradačac, went to primary school in Đurđenovac and then on to high school in Našice, before enrolling at University of Osijek where she earned a degree in Yugoslav languages and literature in 1982. In 1998 she earned her doctorate at the Faculty of Humanities and Social Sciences, University of Zagreb with a thesis called Povijesni roman u hrvatskoj književnosti XX. stoljeća.

Her works have been translated into German, Hungarian, Serbian and Slovenian.

Selected works
 Zašto sam vam lagala (1997)
 Bilješka o piscu (2000) , 
 Lijepi običaji (2000)
 Kao da smo otac i kći (2003) , 
 Krsto i Lucijan (2003)
 Laura nije samo anegdota (2005)
 Tko se boji lika još (2008) , 
 Knjiga od žena, muškaraca, gradova i rastanaka (2009)

References

1959 births
Living people
People from Gradačac
Croats of Bosnia and Herzegovina
Croatian novelists
Croatian women writers
University of Osijek alumni
Faculty of Humanities and Social Sciences, University of Zagreb alumni
Academic staff of the University of Osijek
Academic staff of the University of Zagreb
Croatian women novelists